Shahrah-e-Quaid-e-Azam, formerly known as The Mall or Mall Road (Sarak-e-Mall), is a major road in Lahore, Pakistan.

The road was laid out during the British Raj on a route leading to the Governor's House, lined on both sides with Mughal shrines and kilns.

Attractions
Places of historical, cultural and recreational significance on The Mall include:

Gallery

See also
List of streets in Lahore
Charing Cross
Canal Bank Road
Hall Road

References

 
Streets in Lahore
Roads in Lahore